Regianum Peak is the mostly ice-covered peak of elevation 855 m in the northeast part of Stribog Mountains on Brabant Island in the Palmer Archipelago, Antarctica.  It surmounts Paré Glacier to the north and Laënnec Glacier to the south, and has its northern foothills connected to Stavertsi Ridge to the northeast by Viamata Saddle.

The peak is named after the ancient Roman fortress of Regianum in Northwestern Bulgaria.

Location
British mapping in 1980 and 2008.

Maps
 Antarctic Digital Database (ADD). Scale 1:250000 topographic map of Antarctica. Scientific Committee on Antarctic Research (SCAR). Since 1993, regularly upgraded and updated.
British Antarctic Territory. Scale 1:200000 topographic map. DOS 610 Series, Sheet W 64 62. Directorate of Overseas Surveys, Tolworth, UK, 1980.
Brabant Island to Argentine Islands. Scale 1:250000 topographic map. British Antarctic Survey, 2008.

Notes

References
 Bulgarian Antarctic Gazetteer. Antarctic Place-names Commission. (details in Bulgarian, basic data in English)
 Regianum Peak. SCAR Composite Antarctic Gazetteer

External links
 Regianum Peak. Copernix satellite image

Mountains of the Palmer Archipelago
Bulgaria and the Antarctic